The Aerfer Sagittario 2 (Italian for sagittarius) was a prototype all-metal single-seat lightweight fighter aircraft built in Italy by Aerfer, intended to serve as an interceptor or light tactical support aircraft. First flown in 1956, it became the first Italian aircraft to break the sound barrier in controlled flight when it reached Mach 1.1 during a dive from 13,725 m (45,000 ft).

Design and development
The Sagittario 2 was based on the earlier Sagittario, which was itself a development of the S.7 piston-engined training aircraft that went into service with the Italian Air Force in small numbers.

A small all-metal aircraft, the Sagittario 2 had its jet engine mounted in the nose, with the exhaust underneath the mid-fuselage. The wing and tail surfaces were highly-swept. 
The cockpit was moved forward of its position on the Sagittario's predecessors, and equipped with a bubble canopy. A tricycle undercarriage was fitted, with the nose gear retracting under the engine.

Development continued as the Ariete.

Operators

 Italian Air Force  operated two aircraft for evaluation test

Specifications (Sagittario 2)

See also

References

Bibliography

 The Aeroplane, December 21, 1956, p. 924
 Buttler, Tony. X-Planes of Europe II: Military Prototype Aircraft from the Golden Age 1946–1974. Manchester, UK: Hikoki Publications, 2015. 
 Giuseppe Ciampaglia, Dal SAI Ambrosini Sagittario all'AERFER Leone, January 2004, IBN editore, with English translation by Stephen Richards

Sagittario 2
1950s Italian fighter aircraft
Single-engined jet aircraft
Mid-wing aircraft
Aircraft first flown in 1956